Ramachandra is the seventh avatar of the god Vishnu in Hinduism.

Ramachandra may also refer to:

 Ramachandran plot, in biochemistry, a diagram visualization of protein angles
 A fictional alien space ship in Rendezvous with Rama, a book by Arthur C. Clarke

People with the name
C. Ramchandra (1918–1982), Indian music director
 Chintamani Nagesa Ramachandra Rao (born 1934),  an Indian chemist
Goparaju Ramachandra Rao (1902–1975),  Indian social reformer, atheist, and independence activist
Kanakanahalli Ramachandra (1933–2011), Indian mathematician
Ogirala Ramachandra Rao (1905–1957), Indian music director
Vilayanur S. Ramachandran (born 1951), Insian-American neurologist
Ramachandra Raya (1422–1422), emperor of the Vijayanagara Empire from the Sangama Dynasty